Samraat is a 1982 Indian Hindi-language action thriller film produced by Madan Mohla under the Seven Arts Pictures banner and directed by Mohan Segal. It stars Dharmendra, Jeetendra, Hema Malini and Zeenat Aman, with music composed by Laxmikant–Pyarelal. The film was recorded as "Average" at the box office.

Plot
The film begins with celebrations of the New Year party on a ship Samraat. Ranveer its proprietary is a crime lord of the netherworld. Once, he smuggles an enormous amount of gold bars allying to his acolyte Gomes, the cargo in charge. Chawla the captain of the ship detects it when huge combat erupts. Hence, Ranveer drowns the ship in the middle of the sea, seizes Chawla, and forges him as a traitor. Being cognizant of it, Suman, daughter of Chawla vows to prove her father’s integrity. During that plight, she learns about two vagabond expert sea drivers Ram & Raj, and shades them for support to find Samraat. Meanwhile, Ranveer backstabs Gomes and fortunately, he is rescued by Ram & Raj thereby Gomes gazes at their talent. Hence, he plans vengeance against Ranveer by accompanying these warriors. In this venturesome puzzle, the pawns move on, while Ram falls for Gomes's daughter Jennifer and Raj for Suman. Besides, Ranveer torments Chawla for the whereabouts of the ship but he stands strong. Ultimately, Ram & Raj succeed in identifying it, when discord arouses between the two as Ram desires to own it whereas Raj wants to surrender. Forthwith, Ranveer captures Ram by slaughtering Gomes. Before dying, he confesses his sin to Jennifer and requests her to pay the penalty by proving Chawla guiltless. Parallelly, Ranveer’s stepfather detects Ram as his own whom he deserts for betraying his mother. Overhearing it, Ranveer strikes them. All at once, Raj, Jennifer, & Suman assault, and free Ram but Suman is caught and Ram’s father sacrifices his life. Here, Ram repents, pleads for pardon from Raj and they fuse. Ranveer shows endanger to Suman which compels Chawla to reveal the secret. Now Ranveer enters the sea and Ram & Raj chase him. After an adventurous underwater war, Ram & Raj ceases Ranveer and safeguards the treasure. Finally, the movie ends on a happy note the warriors coupling up with their love interest.

Cast
Dharmendra as Ram
Jeetendra as Raju
Hema Malini as Jennifer Gomes / Jenny
Zeenat Aman as Suman / Sandhya Chawla
Amjad Khan as Ranbir
Kader Khan
Satyendra Kapoor as Kartar Singh
Shreeram Lagoo as Gomes
Om Shivpuri as Captain Chawla
Shashikala
Usha Kiran
Purnima

Soundtrack
Lyrics: Anand Bakshi

Release
The film was released in Iran in a Blu-ray format.

References

External links

1980s Hindi-language films
Films scored by Laxmikant–Pyarelal
Indian action thriller films
Films set on ships
Cross-dressing in Indian films
Underwater action films
1982 action thriller films